is a 1974 Japanese comedy film directed by Yoji Yamada. It stars Kiyoshi Atsumi as Torajirō Kuruma (Tora-san), and Yukiyo Toake as his love interest or "Madonna". Tora-san's Lullaby is the fourteenth entry in the popular, long-running Otoko wa Tsurai yo series. It marks the debut of actor Masami Shimojō in the role of Tora-san's Uncle Tatsuzō. The third actor in this role, Shimojō would play the character until the end of the series.

Synopsis
During his travels Tora-san meets a troubled father with a baby. He shares a drink with the man who then abandons the baby into Tora-san's care. At his hometown in Shibamata, Tokyo, the family is worried about who will take care of the family shop once Tora-san's aunt and uncle have died. Tora-san arrives with the baby causing family and neighbors to speculate that he is the father. The family takes the sickly baby to the hospital where Tora-san falls in love with the nurse, causing complications. The baby's father returns, clearing up misunderstandings.

Cast
 Kiyoshi Atsumi as Torajirō
 Chieko Baisho as Sakura
 Yukiyo Toake as Kyōko Kitani
 Masami Shimojō as Kuruma Tatsuzō
 Chieko Misaki as Tsune Kuruma (Torajiro's aunt)
 Gin Maeda as Hiroshi Suwa
 Hayato Nakamura as Mitsuo Suwa
 Hisao Dazai as Boss (Umetarō Katsura)
 Gajirō Satō as Genkō
 Chishū Ryū as Gozen-sama
 Tsunehiko Kamijō as Yatarō Ōkawa
 Masumi Harukawa as Odoriko

Critical appraisal
Stuart Galbraith IV writes that Tora-san's Lullaby is a "typically fine entry [in the Otoko wa Tsurai yo series] with not much to distinguish it from the rest of the series, though it's still quite good." He writes that by this point in the series, part of the pleasure in the films was in references to past films. He judges the relationship between the baby and Tora-san's Aunt Tsune to be one of the best aspects of the film. It is remembered from films past that Tsune has no children, and that Tora-san and his sister were adopted by their aunt and uncle. The German-language site molodezhnaja gives Tora-san's Lullaby three out of five stars.

Availability
Tora-san's Lullaby was released theatrically on December 28, 1974. In Japan, the film was released on videotape in 1995, and in DVD format in 1995 and 2005.

References

Bibliography

English

German

Japanese

External links
 Tora-san's Lullaby at www.tora-san.jp (official site)

1974 films
Films directed by Yoji Yamada
Films set in Gunma Prefecture
Films set in Saga Prefecture
Films set in Saitama Prefecture
1974 comedy films
1970s Japanese-language films
Otoko wa Tsurai yo films
Japanese sequel films
Shochiku films
Films with screenplays by Yôji Yamada
1970s Japanese films